Rignano Garganico is a town and comune of the province of Foggia in the Apulia region of southern Italy.

Geography
Apricena, Foggia, San Marco in Lamis, San Severo and San Giovanni Rotondo are neighbouring towns. In 2017, migrants were removed from a refugee camp setup in Rignano Garganico.

Main sights
Paglicci Cave and the annexed museum

References

Cities and towns in Apulia